Ocate is an unincorporated community located in Mora County, New Mexico, United States. Ocate has a post office with ZIP code 87734, which opened on January 10, 1870.

It is the location of the J. P. Strong Store and of the Narciso Valdez House, which are listed on the National Register of Historic Places.

In April 2022, Ocate was threatened by the Cooks Peak Fire, which burned tens of thousands of acres in Mora and Colfax counties.

References

Unincorporated communities in Mora County, New Mexico
Unincorporated communities in New Mexico